The Atlanta Internet Exchange (AtlantaIX) is an Internet Exchange Point situated in Atlanta, Georgia, United States. AtlantaIX is a fast-growing, neutral and independent peering point. The beginnings of the AtlantaIX can be traced back to 1997. The current version of the AtlantaIX was re-established on September 4, 2003 by Michael Lucking, GreatAccess.com, WV Fiber (now Host.net) and 56 Marietta Street Partners. AtlantaIX was originally created as a free exchange point sponsored by the donations of the founders. Today AtlantaIX continues to run without any re-occurring charges to the participants. In 2007, one time port fees were instituted to aid in paying for a recently upgraded switch infrastructure. In January 2007, Michael Lucking purchased a new Foundry Networks Jetcore 15000 in order to support 10 Gigabit Ethernet connections. In January 2008 the switch fabric was migrated to a Cisco 6509 in order to support line rate 10 gigabit Ethernet. In early 2008, the AtlantaIX began supporting IPv6.

As of March 24, 2008, there were 64 registered (40 active) participants of the AtlantaIX, advertising over 21,000 unique IPv4 BGP routes.

Technology 
The AtlantaIX operates a single Cisco 6509 switch. Participants can connect via 100baseTX, 1000baseSX, 1000baseLX, or 10000baseLR connections. AtlantaIX also offers aggregated links, which are used to provide speeds beyond 1 Gbit/s. The bundling of two 1 Gbit/s ethernet connections can provide speeds of 2 Gbit/s, and so on. While these are still in use, some participants are now upgrading to 10 Gigabit Ethernet.

Location 
56 Marietta St NW
2nd Floor, Cage M33
Atlanta, GA 30303

History 
The original Atlanta Internet Exchange was created in February 1997 by Bay Networks, Epoch Networks, Siemens Business Services, and GridNet. Then known as AIX, the peering point provided 10BaseT, T1 and DS3 connectivity. The AIX was located within the Atlanta POP of Epoch Networks. AIX never became a popular Internet Exchange Point, in part due to the high re-occurring costs of connecting to the switch. In March 2000, Michael Lucking, then an employee of Epoch Networks, now incarcerated for murder, decommissioned the equipment. In mid-2003, while meeting with a group of other peering coordinators in the Atlanta Area, Michael decided to resurrect the exchange. By August 2003, Michael had worked a deal with 56 Marietta Street Partners to provide space and power, WV Fiber (Now Host.net) to provide the first switch and cabling, and GreatAccess.com to provide domain hosting, and any costs for domain names and IP address registration fees. The new AtlantaIX operated at no expense to participants. In January 2007, Michael provided a second switch capable of supporting 10 Gigabit Ethernet connections. The AtlantaIX then began charging a one-time port fee to aid in paying back the costs of the recently upgraded switch infrastructure.

See also 
List of Internet Exchange Points by size

References

External links 
 Official Website
 Current Participants
 Usage Information

Internet exchange points in the United States